The episodes from the anime television series  are based on the Gin Tama manga by Hideaki Sorachi. The series premiered in TV Tokyo on April 8, 2015. It is a sequel to the Gintama anime series which has been on hiatus since 2013. The studio making the new season is BN Pictures, a new subsidiary of Bandai Namco Entertainment. Chizuru Miyawaki is directing the new season with previous season's director Yoichi Fujita supervising. The series continues the story of eccentric samurai, Gintoki Sakata, his apprentice, Shinpachi Shimura, and a teenage alien girl named Kagura and their work as freelancers, who do odd jobs in order to pay the rent, which usually goes unpaid anyway. 

Eight pieces of theme music are used: four opening themes and four ending themes. The first opening theme is "DAYxDAY" by BLUE ENCOUNT and the first ending theme is "DESTINY", performed by Negoto. The second opening theme is "Pride Kakumei" by CHiCO with HoneyWorks and the second ending theme is "Saigo Made Ii" by Aqua Timez. The third opening is "Beautiful Days" by OKAMOTO's and the third ending is "Glorious Days" by THREE LIGHTS DOWN KINGS. The fourth opening theme is "KNOW KNOW KNOW" by DOES and the fourth ending theme is "Acchi Muite" by Swimy.

Episode list

References

External links
Official Gintama website

°